"Come On, Let's Go" is a song written and originally recorded by Ritchie Valens in 1958. It was the first of four charting singles from his self-titled debut album, and reached number 42 on the U.S. Billboard Hot 100 in late 1958.

Renditions by other artists
British teen idol Tommy Steele covered "Come On, Let's Go" shortly after Valens' hit was released in the U.S.  His version reached number 10 in the United Kingdom.

American rock group the McCoys recorded "Come On, Let's Go" and included it on their 1966 album, You Make Me Feel So Good. Also released as a single, it reached the Top 40 on the U.S. and Canadian charts.

Los Lobos covered the song in 1987 for the soundtrack of the 1987 Ritchie Valens biographical movie starring Lou Diamond Phillips. Their version reached number 18 in the United Kingdom. and number 21 in the U.S. It was also a track on Cars: The Video Game.

Japanese experimental music group The Gerogerigegege recorded the song and included it on their 1990 album Tokyo Anal Dynamite.

Chart history

References

External links
 
 
 
 

1958 songs
1958 singles
1966 singles
1987 singles
Ritchie Valens songs
The McCoys songs
Los Lobos songs
Tommy Steele songs
Songs written by Ritchie Valens
Slash Records singles
Bang Records singles